The Mothers of Gynecology Monument by Michelle Browder was unveiled in Montgomery, Alabama, on September 24, 2021. The statues depict Anarcha Westcott, Betsey, and Lucy, three enslaved women who were patients of controversial doctor and "father of gynecology" J. Marion Sims, whose office was nearby. The statues were made from discarded metal objects—the artist asked for contributions from the public—"to symbolize how Black women have been treated and to demonstrate the beauty in the broken and discarded."

On February 16, 2022, the Medical Association of the State of Alabama visited the monument and presented Browder with a $15,000 donation.

See also
 2021 in art
 Mothers of Gynecology Movement
 https://www.pbs.org/newshour/tag/mothers-of-gynecology

References

External links
 Picture of the Monument.
 AnarchaLucyBetsey.org, artist's web site
 Outdoor painting of Anarcha, Lucy, and Betsey in downtown Montgomery. Artist?

2021 establishments in Alabama
2021 sculptures
African-American history in Montgomery, Alabama
Buildings and structures in Montgomery, Alabama
Gynaecology
Monuments and memorials in Alabama
Outdoor sculptures in Alabama
Sculptures of women in the United States
Statues in Alabama
Sculptures of African Americans
Monuments and memorials to victims of slavery in the United States
Women in Alabama
Monuments and memorials to women
J. Marion Sims